The modern Hindi language and Urdu language are mutually intelligible in colloquial form, but use different scripts when written, and have mutually intelligible literary forms. The history of Bible translations into Hindi and Urdu is closely linked, with the early translators of "Hindustani" simply producing the same version with different scripts: Devanagari and Nastaliq, as well as Roman.

The first translation of part of the Bible in Hindi, Genesis, was made in manuscript by Benjamin Schultze (1689-1760), a German Missionary, who arrived in India to establish an English mission in 1726 and worked on completing Bartholomäus Ziegenbalg's Bible translations into Tamil and then Bible translations into Telugu. His translation of parts of Genesis was published in Halle in 1745 along with a grammar of the local Hindi language he had encountered in Madras.

Hindi
As with Bible translations into Bengali (his own work), and into Oriya, Sanskrit, Marathi, and Assamese (with the aid of local scholars) an important early stage of the Hindi Bible rests with the work of William Carey in Serampore. Though this had to be revised by John Parsons of Monghyr. Carey attracted also the interest of Henry Martyn, later of Persia, to Hindi. Presbyterian Samuel H. Kellogg who taught at the seminary in Allahabad headed three translators working on translation of the Old Testament into Hindi, including William Hooper, of the Church Missionary Society, and Joseph Arthur Lambert. Kellogg's Hindi Grammar (1876, 1893) is still consulted today. However, 18 years after Kellogg's death in 1899, Edwin Greaves of the London Missionary Society, and author of a Grammar of Modern Hindi (1896, 1908, 1921), in 1917 signalled his concerns about the adequacy of Hindi Bible translations in his Report on Protestant Hindi Christian literature.

In collaboration with Church centric bible translation, Free Bibles India has published a Hindi translation online.

In 2016, the New World Translation of the Holy Scriptures was released by Jehovah's Witnesses as a complete Bible translation in Hindi. This replaced the earlier partial translation comprising only the New Testament. The full Bible was published online (also offline in PDF format) with mobile versions released through JW Library application in App stores.

Urdu
The Bible was first published in the Urdu language in 1843, though the New Testament was published by Benjamin Shultze of the Danish Mission in 1745. Robert Cotton Mather printed new editions at Mirzapur in 1870.

Revisions were published in 1989, 1998 and 2005.  The Bible is written in Nastaʿlīq script but is also available in the Devanagari and Roman Urdu script from the Bible Society of India. In 2004 the Bible was made available online, but in PDF or image format only, due to the difficulties of typesetting the Nastaʿlīq script.  In 2009 a Unicode version was made available beginning with the New Testament.  The complete Bible online in Unicode is also available. International Bible Society also published New Urdu Version of Bible, this version is based on New International Version of Bible.

In collaboration with Church centric bible translation, Free Bibles India has published an Urdu translation online.

In 2015, the New Testament of the New World Translation of the Holy Scriptures was released in Urdu (Arabic script) by Jehovah's Witnesses. It was published online (also in offline PDF format) with mobile versions released through JW Library application in App stores.

Comparison

References

External links

Hindi Versions
 Hindi Bible of 1834 (Vol 2: 1 Chronicles - Malachi) by William Bowley/Calcutta Auxiliary Bible Society: In Public Domain
 The Holy Bible in the Hindi Language North India Bible Society, Allahabad : In Public Domain
 Hindi Bible of 1896 North India Auxiliary Bible Society : In Public Domain
Hindi Audio Bible

Urdu Versions
 Urdu Geo Version : Copyright 2010 Geolink Resource Consultants, LLC. Published by Good Word Communication Services Pvt. Ltd., 
Persian script  pdf  print 
Audio Narration of Urdu Bible
Hindi
History of Christianity in Pakistan
Urdu